Prem Bhatia may refer to:

 Prem Bhatia (journalist) and diplomat (1922–1995)
 Prem Bhatia (cricketer) (1940–2018), Indian cricketer
 Prem Kumar Bhatia, Indian mathematician, astrophysicist and professor